Heidy Purga (born 18 March 1975 in Tartu) is an Estonian radio and television presenter, television director, journalist and politician. She has been a member of the XIII Riigikogu and XIV Riigikogu.

From 1994 to 1996 she studied theatre director discipline at Tallinn University. In 2002 she graduated from Concordia International University Estonia in electronic media.

She have been the presenter, producer and editor of several television and radio channels. From 2008 to 2015 she was the producer for song contest Eesti Laul.

Since 2014 she is a member of Estonian Reform Party.

References

1975 births
21st-century Estonian women politicians
Estonian radio personalities
Estonian Reform Party politicians
Estonian television presenters
Estonian television producers
Estonian women journalists
Estonian women television producers
Living people
Members of the Riigikogu, 2015–2019
Members of the Riigikogu, 2019–2023
Members of the Riigikogu, 2023–2027
People from Tartu
Tallinn University alumni
Women members of the Riigikogu